Lincoln station is an MBTA Commuter Rail in Lincoln, Massachusetts. It serves the Fitchburg Line, and is located on Lincoln Road. There has been continuous commuter service to Lincoln since the station stop was established before 1850. A station building formerly stood on the outbound side; it was demolished by 1962.

Station layout

Lincoln has an unusual configuration, largely unique on the system (though similar to Waltham). The station has two side platforms, both adjacent to the outbound track but on opposite sides of the Lincoln Road grade crossing. Outbound trains stop at the north platform, while inbound trains stop opposite the south platform and passengers use two asphalt crossings to board. The configuration was made to minimize the number of stopped trains that block Lincoln Road, as the town emergency services are based nearby and Lincoln Road is the most direct route to the town center.

Both platforms are low-level; Lincoln station is not handicapped accessible.

References

External links

MBTA - Lincoln
View of the station from Lincoln Road on Google Maps Street View

Stations along Boston and Maine Railroad lines
MBTA Commuter Rail stations in Middlesex County, Massachusetts